Heysham nuclear power station is operated by EDF Energy in Heysham, Lancashire, England. The site is divided into two separately-managed nuclear power stations, Heysham 1 and Heysham 2, both with two reactors of the advanced gas-cooled reactor (AGR) type.

In 2010, the British government announced that Heysham was one of the eight sites it considered suitable for future nuclear power stations.

On 1 August 2016, Heysham 2's Unit 8 broke the world record for longest continuous operation of a nuclear generator without a shutdown.  This record-breaking run exceeds the previous record of 894days set by Pickering Nuclear Generating Station's Unit 7 (Lake Ontario, Canada) in 1994. The reactor has generated 13.5TWh of electricity so far during this continuous operation, taking its lifetime generation to 115.46TWh.

Heysham 1
Construction of Heysham 1, which was undertaken by British Nuclear Design & Construction (BNDC), a consortium backed of English Electric, Babcock & Wilcox and Taylor Woodrow Construction, began in 1970, with the first reactor commencing operations in 1983 and the second reactor following in 1984.  However, initial production levels were low, and full commercial operation was only declared in 1989. It is likely to remain in operation until 2024. Its generating capacity is 1,150MWe. The reactors were supplied by National Nuclear Corporation and the turbines by GEC. There were four 17.5MW auxiliary gas turbines on the site, these had been first commissioned in January 1977.

Heysham 1 shares its reactor design with Hartlepool nuclear power station, which introduced the replaceable pod boiler design. The CEGB specified a compact design for the Heysham 1 and Hartlepool power station reactor islands in comparison to the design of the two preceding stations at Hinkley Point B and Hunterston B in order to reduce the capital cost, but this caused expensive construction delays because of restricted access. The Heysham 2 reactor island occupies a much larger footprint than Heysham 1 for a similar design output of power.

In 2013, a defect was found by a regular inspection in one of the eight pod boilers of unit 1. The reactor resumed operation at a lower output level with the defective pod boiler disabled, until June 2014 when more detailed inspections confirmed a crack in the boiler spine. As a precaution, unit 2 and the sister Hartlepool nuclear power station were also shut down for inspection.

Heysham 1 was scheduled to be shut down for defueling and then decommissioning in March 2024. EDF subsequently announced plans to extend the life of Heysham 1 and Hartlepool to March 2026.

Heysham 2

The construction, which was undertaken by a consortium known as National Nuclear Corporation (NNC), began in 1979 and the station opened in 1988. Its generating capacity is 1,250MWe, and it is estimated to keep running until at least 2030.  Heysham 2 shares its reactor design with Torness nuclear power station near Dunbar in East Lothian, and is a development of the reactor design used at Hinkley Point B in Somerset. The reactors were supplied by NNC, the turbines and boilers by NEI.

This caused alarm among local residents, and numerous calls to the police reporting “gunshots”. EDF later reported that a reactor had earlier experienced a "non-planned shutdown after an electrical fault", and the noise was from the re-start process when unsilenced relief valves lifted on the Startup Vessels during boiler feeding.

Heysham 2 is expected to be shutdown in 2028, prior to a three-year defueling period and then decommissioning.

See also

Nuclear power in the United Kingdom
Energy policy of the United Kingdom
Energy use and conservation in the United Kingdom

References

External links

Heysham 1 official website
Heysham 2 official website
Heysham 1, Nuclear Engineering International wall chart, 1971
Heysham 2/Torness, Nuclear Engineering International wall chart, 1981

Nuclear power stations in England
Buildings and structures in the City of Lancaster
Power stations in North West England
Nuclear power stations using Advanced Gas-cooled Reactors